Zachloritika (Greek: Ζαχλωρίτικα) is a village in the municipal unit of Diakopto, Achaea, Greece. It is  located on the left bank of the river Vouraikos, 1 km west of Diakopto. The Greek National Road 8A (Patras - Aigio - Corinth) passes south of the village. In 2011 Zachloritika had a population of 339.

Population

See also
List of settlements in Achaea

References

External links
 Zachloritika GTP Travel Pages

Aigialeia
Diakopto
Populated places in Achaea